Daniel Armand N'Gom Kome (born 19 May 1980) is a Cameroonian former professional footballer who played as a midfielder.

Playing in Spain since 1999 and representing nearly ten clubs during his professional career, he received a passport from that country in August 2006.

Kome played mainly for Numancia and Tenerife, amassing Segunda División totals of 224 matches and 24 goals over nine seasons. He appeared for Cameroon at the 2002 World Cup and three Africa Cup of Nations tournaments.

Club career
Born in Bangou, West Region, Kome moved to Spain in 1999 at the age of 19 and played there for over a decade. His first team was Atlético Madrid B, and he joined Levante UD in the third division after one season.

After representing CD Numancia, Kome made his La Liga debut with another Madrid club, Getafe CF, first appearing 15 minutes in a 3–1 home win against Athletic Bilbao. On 6 February 2005 he scored the game's only goal in a home victory former side Numancia and, after relative playing time, he dropped down to the second level and signed with Ciudad de Murcia.

Kome started the 2006–07 campaign with RCD Mallorca but, after being overlooked, left for Real Valladolid during the January transfer window, on a two-and-a-half-year deal. However, after being sparingly played and although still under contract, he managed to reach a buyout and moved to CD Tenerife on 21 July 2008, on a Bosman transfer. 

On 13 June 2009, Kome scored the game's only goal at Girona FC as his team confirmed their return to the top tier after seven years. He featured regularly for the Canarians in the following two years, but they suffered consecutive relegations.

International career
A Cameroon international since 2000, Kome was also part of the nation's winning team at that year's Summer Olympic Games. At full level, he appeared twice at the 2002 FIFA World Cup and played four matches for the 2002 Africa Cup of Nations winners in Egypt.

Kome was also selected for the 2004 and 2006 editions: in the latter, he scored in the epic 11–12 penalty shootout quarter-final loss against Ivory Coast.

Honours

Club
Valladolid
Segunda División: 2006–07

International
Cameroon
African Cup of Nations: 2002
Summer Olympic Games: 2000
 African games in 1999.

References

External links

1980 births
Living people
People from West Region (Cameroon)
Cameroonian footballers
Association football midfielders
Coton Sport FC de Garoua players
La Liga players
Segunda División players
Atlético Madrid B players
Levante UD footballers
CD Numancia players
Getafe CF footballers
Ciudad de Murcia footballers
RCD Mallorca players
Real Valladolid players
CD Tenerife players
Cameroon under-20 international footballers
Cameroon international footballers
2001 FIFA Confederations Cup players
2002 FIFA World Cup players
2002 African Cup of Nations players
2004 African Cup of Nations players
2006 Africa Cup of Nations players
Olympic footballers of Cameroon
Footballers at the 2000 Summer Olympics
Olympic medalists in football
Medalists at the 2000 Summer Olympics
Olympic gold medalists for Cameroon
Cameroonian expatriate footballers
Expatriate footballers in Spain
Cameroonian expatriate sportspeople in Spain